The Columbus Invitational was a golf tournament played in Columbus, Ohio from 1946 to 1948. The first two events were held at Columbus Country Club while the final edition was played at Wyandot Country Club. The event was sponsored by the Zooligans, an organisation that raised money for Columbus Zoo.

Winners

References

Former PGA Tour events
Golf in Ohio